ELTA 2 is Bosnian specialized cable music channel based in Tuzla. During the day, ELTA 2 broadcasts the best music videos from domestic and foreign artists. The program is mainly produced in the Bosnian language. ELTA 2 is available via cable systems throughout the Bosnia and Herzegovina.

References

External links
 Official Website
 ELTA 2 in Facebook
 Communications Regulatory Agency of Bosnia and Herzegovina

Mass media in Tuzla
Music organizations based in Bosnia and Herzegovina
Music television channels
Television stations in Bosnia and Herzegovina
Television channels in North Macedonia
Television channels and stations established in 2012